Switzerland competed at the 1980 Summer Paralympics in Arnhem, Netherlands. 65 competitors from Switzerland won 29 medals including 9 gold, 10 silver and 10 bronze and finished 15th in the medal table.

See also 
 Switzerland at the Paralympics
 Switzerland at the 1980 Summer Olympics

References 

1980
1980 in Swiss sport
Nations at the 1980 Summer Paralympics